The Washington Free Beacon is an American conservative political journalism website launched in 2012.

The website is financially backed by Paul Singer, an American billionaire hedge fund manager and conservative activist.

History 
The Free Beacon was founded by Michael Goldfarb, Aaron Harrison, and Matthew Continetti. It launched on February 7, 2012, as a project of the Center for American Freedom, a conservative advocacy group modeled on the liberal Center for American Progress.

The site is known for its conservative reporting, with the intention of publicizing stories and influencing the coverage of the mainstream media, and modeled after liberal counterparts in the media such as Think Progress and Talking Points Memo. The site has roots in the neoconservative wing of the Republican Party.

Jack Hunter, a staff member of Senator Rand Paul's office, resigned in 2013 after a Free Beacon report detailing his past as a pro-secessionist radio shock jock known as the "Southern Avenger". 

The publication also broke several stories about Hillary Clinton's successful 1975 legal defense of an accused child rapist that attracted national media attention.

From October 2015 to May 2016, the Washington Free Beacon hired Fusion GPS to conduct opposition research on "multiple candidates" during the 2016 presidential election, including Donald Trump. The Free Beacon stopped funding this research when Donald Trump had clinched the Republican nomination. Fusion GPS would later hire former British intelligence officer Christopher Steele and produce the Steele dossier that alleged links between the Trump campaign and the Kremlin. Paul Singer, a billionaire and hedge fund manager, who is a major donor to the Free Beacon, said he was unaware of this dossier until it was published by BuzzFeed News in January 2017. On October 27, 2017, the Free Beacon publicly disclosed that it had hired Fusion GPS, and stated that it "had no knowledge of or connection to the Steele dossier, did not pay for the dossier, and never had contact with, knowledge of, or provided payment for any work performed by Christopher Steele."

The Free Beacon came under criticism for its reporting on Fusion GPS. Three days before it was revealed that it was the Free Beacon that had funded the work by Fusion GPS, the Free Beacon wrote that the firm's work “was funded by an unknown GOP client while the primary was still going on." The Free Beacon has published pieces that have sought to portray the work by Fusion GPS as unreliable "without noting that it considered Fusion GPS reliable enough to pay for its services." In an editor's note, Continetti said "the reason for this omission is that the authors of these articles, and the particular editors who reviewed them, were unaware of this relationship," and that the outlet was reviewing its editorial process to avoid similar issues in the future.

In 2022, a Free Beacon article by Patrick Hauf accused the administration of President Joe Biden of planning to use federal dollars to fund safe smoking kits that included crack pipes, as part of a harm reduction initiative; this prompted outrage among Republicans in Congress, some of whom proposed a bill to ban the federal government from funding drug paraphernalia. The Washington Post later reported that, according to a United States Department of Health and Human Services spokesperson, "Hauf jumped to a conclusion that was not warranted" because, while the safe smoking kits were meant to reduce risk in smoking "any illicit substance", the agency funding the program "d[id] not specify the kits' elements, only the parameters"; thus, although such smoking kits often include crack pipes and (according to a Drug Policy Alliance spokesman interviewed for the Washington Post article) some of the groups planning to apply for the funding had assumed that its kits would also include them, it was not clear that the agency had intended to include them.

Reception 
Jim Rutenberg of The New York Times described the reporting style of the Free Beacon as "gleeful evisceration." The Atlantics Conor Friedersdorf called the Free Beacons mission "decadent and unethical".

Ben Howe wrote in The Daily Beast that The Washington Free Beacon established "itself as a credible source of conservative journalism with deep investigative dives and exposes on money in politics", but after Trump's election it was "producing less actual reporting" and moved "more towards the path of least resistance: spending their time criticizing the left and the media, along with healthy doses of opinion writing." McKay Coppins in the Columbia Journalism Review wrote in September 2018 that while the website contains "a fair amount of trolling... it has also earned a reputation for real-deal journalism ... If a partisan press really is the future, we could do worse than the Free Beacon."

Jeet Heer wrote in The New Republic: "Much of the conservative press is terrible but the Free Beacon is far superior to propagandist fare like The Daily Caller. Unlike other comparable conservative websites, the Free Beacon makes an effort to do original reporting. Its commitment to journalism should be welcomed by liberals." In 2015, Mother Jones wrote positively of the Free Beacon, commenting that it is far better than contemporary conservative outlets such as The Daily Caller. Mother Jones however said that "the Beacon hasn't always steered clear of stories that please the base but don't really stand up," and that it tends towards inflammatory pieces that "push conservatives' buttons". That same year, the Washingtonian wrote that "The Beacons emphasis on newsgathering sets it apart among right-facing publications."

In 2019, Eliana Johnson left Politico to become Editor-in-Chief of the Free Beacon. Ben Smith wrote in BuzzFeed News that the Free Beacon was "[a]lternately parodic and wire-service serious," and had "broken major political news, mostly negative" (although its focus was mainly directed against Democrats). Smith continued that the Free Beacons hard news reporting differentiated it from other conservative outlets which were either opinion focused or did not produce journalism which met mainstream standards.

See also
 Alternative media (U.S. political right)

References

External links
 

American political websites
News aggregators
American conservative websites
American political blogs
Conservative media in the United States
Criticism of journalism
American news websites
Political organizations based in the United States
American journalism organizations
Internet properties established in 2012
Online magazines published in the United States